The British Basketball League Coach of the Year award is an annual award presented to head coaches in the British Basketball League, and has been awarded at the end of every campaign since the 1987–1988 season. The award is decided by a panel consisting of each of the league’s head coaches who submit one vote each at the end of the regular season, and the coach with the most votes is presented with the award. The award is sponsored by Molten. Rob Paternostro has won the award the most times, collecting it on seven occasions. Kevin Cadle won the award five times and is listed in the Guinness Book of Records for the coaching the "most successful team ever in British Sport 1989–90".

Winners

 There was no winner for the 2019-20 season after the season’s cancellation due to the COVID-19 pandemic.

References

BBL.org.uk
MikeShaft.com

British Basketball League